"Peach" is a song by American musician Prince from his 1993 compilations, The Hits 2 and The Hits/The B-Sides.

The female moan heard on the track is that of American actress Kim Basinger. Prince performed the song live during his 1993 tour. It was the main sound theme of the Spanish-language talk show Corazón, Corazón in the mid 1990s. The accompanying music video was filmed inside and outside of Paisley Park Studios, and was included in The Hits Collection on home video.

Release
The B-side is a live version of "Nothing Compares 2 U" in the US, while the UK backed the song with an edit of "My Name Is Prince". In addition, the UK issued two CD singles for "Peach", each backed by hits not on the collection. The first disc contains "Peach", "Mountains", "Partyman", and "Money Don't Matter 2 Night". The second disc contains "Peach", along with "I Wish U Heaven", "Girls & Boys", and "My Name Is Prince". The second disc was sold in a special fold-out collector's case with a placeholder for the first disc, which was sold separately.

Critical reception
Larry Flick from Billboard wrote, "He does one of his many personalities on this rockin' pop ditty, which will please fans of his steamy hit, "Cream". A live and aggressive drum beat kicks pop radio shape into a simple and instantly memorable melody. To go with this different mood is yet another timbre of the Paisley dude's unique voice." Pan-European magazine Music & Media commented, "Attention, watch your teeth! This peach is as hard as a coconut, and Prince himself is disguised as wild child Iggy Pop." They added, "It's very different". Mike Soutar from Smash Hits gave "Peach" two out of five, saying, "It sounds like Prince, it's on a topic which Prince has explored more than adequately [...] and it's his favourite colour. It probably sounds just right on a Prince LP."

Chart performance
"Peach" peaked at number seven on the US Billboard Bubbling Under Hot 100 Singles chart; however, it did peak at number 14 in the United Kingdom. Its B-side, "Nothing Compares 2 U", charted at number 62 on the Billboard Hot R&B Singles chart.

Charts

Weekly charts
"Peach"'

"Nothing Compares 2 U"'

Year-end charts

Cover versions
Rod Stewart recorded a cover of "Peach", featuring Slash on guitar, on his 2001 album Human. The song was also released as the B-side of his single "I Can't Deny It".

References

 

1992 songs
1993 singles
Song recordings produced by Prince (musician)
Songs written by Prince (musician)
Paisley Park Records singles
Prince (musician) songs
Warner Records singles